Charles Curry is the name of:

Charles F. Curry (1858–1930), U.S. Representative from California and chairman of the Committee on Territories
Charles F. Curry, Jr. (1893–1972), U.S. Representative from California, member of the Seventy-second Congress of U.S.
Charles Madison Curry (1869–1944), Professor of Literature at Indiana State Normal School

See also